Joseph DeLuca (March 17, 1893 – March 20, 1952) was an Italian-American mobster who controlled the smuggling and distribution of narcotics with his brother Frank DeLuca in Kansas City, Missouri for almost four decades.

Born Giuseppe DeLuca, DeLuca emigrated with his brother Frank from their native Sicily and eventually found his way to Kansas City, where they became major figures in Kansas City's underworld. Although having several arrests for federal narcotics violations since the 1930s, DeLuca ran a major drug ring operation for mobster Joseph DiGiovanni until his arrest and eventually conviction in 1942, along with seven other members (his girlfriend would be convicted of jury tampering the following year). In 1952, DeLuca and his brother were named two of the "Five Iron Men" of Kansas City by the US Senate Kefauver Committee.

Further reading
United States. Congress. Senate. Special Committee to Investigate Organized Crime in Interstate Commerce. Investigation of Organized Crime in Interstate Commerce. Washington, D.C.: U.S. Govt. Print. Off., 1951. 
United States. Congress. Senate. Government Operations Committee. Organized Crime and Illicit Traffic in Narcotics. 1964.

References
Sifakis, Carl. The Mafia Encyclopedia. New York: Da Capo Press, 2005.

External links
The Five Iron Men Of Kansas City by Allan May
The History of the Kansas City Family by Allan May
Las Vegas Review Journal - Mob's LV clout doubtful by Jane Ann Morrison
Trial in mobster slaying under way by Carri Geer

1893 births
1952 deaths
American gangsters of Sicilian descent
Kansas City crime family
Italian emigrants to the United States